Lallans is a periodical subscription magazine in the Scots Language established by the Scots Language Society in 1973 and dedicated to the promotion and revived use of the language in literature and letters. The magazine publishes original prose and poetry, Scots translations, reviews of other books and materials also published in Scots, as well as articles, commentary and debate with relevance to the language. All of its content is written in Scots.

Notable editors
The founding editor of Lallans was J. K. Annand who edited the magazine until 1983. Others since include the Scots language poet David Purves (1924–2015), who was editor for 11 years between 1986 and 1995.

References

Scots-language mass media
Scots-language literature
Literary magazines published in Scotland
Magazines established in 1973